A Comedy Roast is a British comedy television show broadcast by Channel 4. After a series of failed attempts by various broadcasters over the years, it is the first adaptation of the American comedy institution of roasting to be produced as a television show in Britain. The first series premiered on 7 April 2010. Hosted by Jimmy Carr it saw Bruce Forsyth, Sharon Osbourne and Chris Tarrant get roasted by various colleagues, comedians and celebrities. The show returned on 15 October 2010 targeting Davina McCall, and again on 5 January 2011 targeting Barbara Windsor.

Episodes

References

External links

Channel 4 comedy
Channel 4 original programming
Roast (comedy)
2010 British television series debuts
2011 British television series endings
2010s British comedy television series
English-language television shows
Television series by Universal Television